House of Wang usually refers to the ruling house of the Korean Goryeo kingdom.

House of Wang may also refer to the ruling houses of these Chinese states:

Rulers of Former Shu (907–925)
Rulers of Min (Ten Kingdoms) (909–945)